Menhaj Al-Sadeghin is a fifteenth-century exegesis of the Quran in Persian in 10 volumes by Molla Fathollah Kashani. This commentary contains moral and Gnostic subjects and it is considerable from the viewpoint of allegory and testifying to Persian poems. The commentary was compiled between 1492 and 1494. An old manuscript of this book dated 1575 C.E. is kept in Astan Quds Razavi’s library.

References
Tahoor Encyclopedia: "Man-haj Al-Sädeghin commentary"

Shia tafsir